Tugan Taymurazovich Sokhiev (born 21 October 1977, Vladikavkaz, Ossetia) is an Ossetian conductor.

Biography
Sokhiev began piano studies at age 7. He first conducted at age 17, inspired by Anatoly Briskin, the conductor of the North Ossetia State Philharmonic Orchestra. He subsequently attended the Saint Petersburg Conservatory, where he was one of the last students of Ilya Musin before the latter's death in 1999. Sokhiev's first opera as a conductor was in a production of La bohème in Iceland.

Following that production in Iceland, General Director of Welsh National Opera (WNO) Anthony Freud named Sokhiev WNO's music director in December 2001, effective from 2003, for an initial contract of 5 years. His initial conducting work with WNO as music director was in revivals of Don Giovanni, Cavalleria rusticana and Pagliacci. His first new production as WNO music director was of Eugene Onegin. He was also in charge of the Russian Series for WNO which contained works by many famous Russian composers. In August 2004, Sokhiev resigned from WNO with immediate effect, after problems with the cast of their new production of Verdi's La traviata. Reports indicated a decline in morale among the WNO orchestra and chorus, and questions about whether Sokhiev was too young and inexperienced for the post.

In 2005, Sokhiev became principal guest conductor and musical adviser with the Orchestre national du Capitole de Toulouse. He received the accolade 'Révélation musicale de l'année' from the French Critics' Union in 2005, after a Paris performance with the Capitole de Toulouse orchestra. In September 2008, he became the orchestra's music director. His most recent Capitole de Toulouse contract extension, announced in December 2019, was through the summer of 2021.

In September 2010, Sokhiev was named principal conductor and artistic director of the Deutsches Symphonie-Orchester Berlin (DSO Berlin), effective in 2012, with an initial contract of 4 years. He took the title of principal conductor designate with immediate effect. In January 2014, the Bolshoi Theatre named Sokhiev its new music director, with an initial contract of 4 years, effective 1 February 2014. In October 2014, Sokhiev stated his intention to stand down from his DSO Berlin post after the 2015-2016 season, to devote greater attention to his Bolshoi post.

On 6 March 2022, Sokhiev resigned as both music director of the Bolshoi Theatre and music director of the Orchestre national du Capitole de Toulouse, citing pressure to make a public statement regarding the 2022 Russian invasion of Ukraine.

Discography 
 Prokofiev: Symphonie No. 5, Scythian Suite, Deutsches Symphonie-Orchester Berlin, Sony Classical, Germany 2016, CD.
 Brahms: A Flight through the Orchestra - Brahms Symphony No. 2, Deutsches Symphonie-Orchester Berlin, EuroArts Music International, Germany 2015, DVD/Blue-ray.
 Prokofiev: Ivan the Terrible, Deutsches Symphonie-Orchester Berlin, Sony Classical, Germany 2014, CD.
 Stravinsky: L'oiseau de feu, Le sacre du printemps, Orchestre National du Capitole de Toulouse, Naïve, France 2012, CD.
 Prokofiev: Violin Concerto No. 2, Rachmaninoff: Symphonic Dances, Orchestre National du Capitole de Toulouse, Naïve, France, 2011, CD.
 Mussorgsky: Pictures at an Exhibition, Tchaikovsky: Symphony No. 4, Orchestre National du Capitole de Toulouse, Naïve, France 2006, CD.
 Prokofiev: Peter and the Wolf, Orchestre National du Capitole de Toulouse, Naïve, France 2007, CD.

References

External links
 ЧУДО-ДИРИЖЕР РОДОМ ИЗ ВЛАДИКАВКАЗА. Журнал "Горец". Для тех, кто любит высоту
 Biography of Tugan Sokhiev on the Askonas Holt website
 French-language biography of Sokhiev from Orchestre national du Capitole de Toulouse page
 German-language page on Sokhiev from the Deutsches Symphonie-Orchester Berlin

1977 births
Living people
20th-century Russian conductors (music)
20th-century Russian male musicians
21st-century Russian conductors (music)
21st-century Russian male musicians
Honored Artists of the Russian Federation
Knights of the Ordre national du Mérite
Recipients of the Medal of the Order "For Merit to the Fatherland" I class
Ossetian people
People from Vladikavkaz
Music directors (opera)
Russian male conductors (music)